Albula oligolepis is a species of marine fish found in the Indo-West Pacific. It is known commonly as the smallscale bonefish.

Taxonomy
Bonefish were once believed to be a single species with a global distribution, however 9 different species have since been identified. There are three identified species in the Atlantic and six in the Pacific.

Albula oligolepis was formerly identified as A. argentea (called A. forsteri or A. neoguinacea in some sources). However, Hidaka et al. (2008) recognized the Indian and Australian populations are distinct from Albula argentea, naming them A. oligolepis.

Description
Albula oligolepis is similar to A. argentea and A. virgata in length of the upper jaw, but differs in having fewer vertebrae and pored lateral-line scales, as well as having the tip of pelvic fin not reaching beyond anterior edge of anus.

Distribution
Albula oligolepis is widespread in the Indian Ocean and the coast of Australia.

References

Albuliformes
Fish of the Indian Ocean
Fish of Australia
Taxa named by John Ernest Randall
Fish described in 2008